Wilfried Klaus is a German television actor best known for playing Kriminalhauptkommissar Horst Schickl in the police procedural SOKO München from 1978 to 2008.

Selected filmography
 Lina Braake (1975)
 Derrick - Season 3, Episode 12: "Risiko" (1976)
  (1978, TV film)
  (1978, TV series)
 Derrick - Season 5, Episode 13: "Abitur" (1978)
 Derrick - Season 8, Episode 9: "Der Untermieter" (1981)
 Derrick - Season 11, Episode 14: "Stellen Sie sich vor, man hat Dr. Prestel erschossen" (1984)
 Derrick - Season 15, Episode 6: "Da läuft eine Riesensache" (1988)

External links

Agency Palz Munich 
Short Biography 

Living people
German male television actors
People from Rosenheim (district)
20th-century German male actors
21st-century German male actors
Year of birth missing (living people)